The International Measurement Confederation (abbreviated IMEKO, from ) is a non-governmental federation of metrological organizations. It was founded in 1958 in Budapest, Hungary.

Structure 

IMEKO has member organizations (MOs) in the following countries: Albania, Austria, Belgium, Brazil, Bulgaria, Canada, China, Congo (Democratic Republic), Croatia, the Czech Republic, Egypt, Finland, France, Germany, Greece, Hungary, India, Italy, Jamaica, Japan, Kazakhstan, Kenya, the Republic of Korea, Nigeria, Poland, Portugal, Romania, Russia, Rwanda, Serbia, Slovakia, Slovenia, South Africa, Spain, Sweden, Switzerland, Thailand, Turkey, Uganda, Ukraine, the United Kingdom, and the United States of America.

IMEKO is entirely staffed by volunteers from its MOs - scientific societies or institutes of the corresponding member countries. They delegate specialists in the different fields of metrology to contribute to the work of IMEKO in the General Council, the boards and the Technical Committees (TCs). The MOs organise IMEKO events (congresses, conferences, workshops, symposia).

 General Council (GC)
 The General Council is the governing body, containing one or two delegates from each Member Organization. Sessions are held annually.

 Technical Board (TB)
 The purpose of the Technical Board is to supervise the Technical Committees. The TB is chaired by the President-Elect. The TB is responsible for creating and disbanding TCs, developing proposals for new TCs, facilitating communication with the journal Measurement, arranging sponsorship, the approval of events to be organized by the TCs, the support of the journal Editorial Board, and helping to prepare Technical Sessions and Round Tables at World Congresses.

 Technical Committees (TCs)
 TC1 - Education and Training in Measurement and Instrumentation
 TC2 - Photonics
 TC3 - Measurement of Force, Mass and Torque
 TC4 - Measurement of Electrical Quantities
 TC5 - Hardness Measurement
 TC6 - Digitalization
 TC7 - Measurement Science
 TC8 - Traceability in Metrology
 TC9 - Flow Measurement
 TC10 - Technical Diagnostics
 TC11 - Metrological Infrastructures
 TC12 -Temperature and Thermal Measurements
 TC13 - Measurements in Biology and Medicine
 TC14 - Measurement of Geometrical Quantities
 TC15 - Experimental Mechanics
 TC16 - Pressure and Vacuum Measurement
 TC17 - Measurement in Robotics
 TC18 - Measurement of Human Functions
 TC19 - Environmental Measurements
 TC20 - Energy Measurement
 TC21 - Mathematical Tools for Measurements
 TC22 - Vibration Measurement
 TC23 - Metrology in Food and Nutrition
 TC24 - Chemical Measurements
 TC25 - Quantum Measurement and Quantum Information

Awards 
Traditionally the following awards are bestowed at the closing ceremony of an IMEKO World Congress:
 Distinguished Service Award, bestowed upon persons for outstanding services to IMEKO, active for many years as well-known specialists in the field of measurement.
 György Striker Junior Paper Award, a donation of the Founder and first Secretary-General of IMEKO and his wife, to be given to a junior author under 35 years of age, whose paper reflects a deep understanding and knowledge of the theme of a World Congress. The sum of the award is USD 1100.

Publications 

IMEKO sponsors three academic journals:
  Measurement, published by Elsevier
  Measurement: Sensors, a new open access companion to Measurement, also published by Elsevier
 Acta IMEKO, an online-only journal

IMEKO activities are further documented in the following publications:
 ACTA IMEKO – proceedings of the World Congresses
 IMEKO TC Events Series – proceedings of Technical Committees events
 IMEKO BULLETIN – semi-annual newsletter
 Repository of publications – proceedings of IMEKO events
 IMEKO's website

International cooperation 

IMEKO is one of the five Sister Federations within FIACC - Five International Associations Co-ordinating Committee, further consisting of:
International Federation of Automatic Control (IFAC)
International Federation for Information Processing (IFIP)
International Federation of Operational Research Societies (IFORS)
International Association for Mathematics and Computers in Simulation (IMACS)

IMEKO also works with International Organization of Legal Metrology (OIML) and the International Bureau of Weights and Measures (BIPM), as well as the IEEE Instrumentation and Measurement Society and the IEEE Engineering in Medicine and Biology Society. The way of co-operation is organising joint events, co-sponsoring events and inviting keynote speakers to each other.

References 

International standards organizations
International scientific organizations
1958 establishments in Hungary
 International organisations based in Hungary
Metrology organizations